George Arthur Paddock (March 24, 1885 – December 29, 1964) was a U.S. Representative from Illinois.

Born in Winnetka, Illinois, Paddock attended the public schools.
He was graduated from Chicago (Illinois) Manual Training School in 1902 and from the University of Virginia at Charlottesville in 1906.
He studied law at the University of Virginia.
He was admitted to the bar in 1907 and commenced practice in Chicago, Illinois.

During the First World War served as a captain and was promoted to major in the 342nd Infantry, 86th Division from 1917 to 1919.

After the war, he resumed the practice of law at Chicago, Illinois and engaged as an investment banker in 1921.

He served as an alderman in Evanston, Illinois from 1931 to 1937 and as park commissioner 1929–1931, 1937, and 1938.  He served as delegate to the Republican State convention in 1936 and also as member and treasurer of Cook County Republican Central Committee from 1938 to 1942.

He also served as member of the Soldiers' and Sailors' Service Commission of Illinois.

Paddock was elected as a Republican to the Seventy-seventh Congress (January 3, 1941 – January 3, 1943).  He was an unsuccessful candidate for renomination in 1942 and resumed investment banking.

He was an hereditary companion of the Military Order of the Loyal Legion of the United States.

He was a resident of Evanston, Illinois, until his death December 29, 1964.  He was interred in Rosehill Cemetery in Chicago.

References

1885 births
1964 deaths
People from Winnetka, Illinois
Military personnel from Illinois
Burials at Rosehill Cemetery
University of Virginia alumni
University of Virginia School of Law alumni
Lawyers from Chicago
United States Army officers
United States Army personnel of World War I
Republican Party members of the United States House of Representatives from Illinois
20th-century American politicians
20th-century American lawyers